Reign in Blood is the third studio album by American thrash metal band Slayer, released on October 7, 1986, by Def Jam Recordings. The album was the band's first collaboration with producer Rick Rubin, whose input helped the band's sound evolve. The release date of the album was delayed because of concerns regarding the lyrical subject matter of the opening track "Angel of Death", which refers to Josef Mengele and describes acts such as human experimentation that he committed at the Auschwitz concentration camp. The band's members stated that they did not condone Nazism and were merely interested in the subject.

Reign in Blood was well received by both critics and fans, and was responsible for bringing Slayer to the attention of a mainstream metal audience. Today, it is often mentioned among the greatest heavy metal records ever. In their 2017 listing of the 100 Greatest Metal albums of all time, Rolling Stone magazine ranked Reign in Blood at #6. Alongside Anthrax's Among the Living, Megadeth's Peace Sells... but Who's Buying?, and Metallica's Master of Puppets, Reign in Blood helped define the sound of the emerging US thrash metal scene in the mid-1980s, and has remained influential since. The album was Slayer's first to enter the US Billboard 200, peaking at number 94, and was certified Gold on November 20, 1992. In 2013, NME ranked it at number 287 in its list of the 500 Greatest Albums of All Time.

Background
Following the positive reception Slayer's previous release Hell Awaits had received, the band's producer and manager Brian Slagel realized the band were in a position to hit the "big time" with their next album. Slagel negotiated with several record labels, among them Rick Rubin and Russell Simmons' Def Jam Recordings. However, Slagel was reluctant to have the band signed to what was at the time primarily a hip hop label. Slayer drummer Dave Lombardo was made aware of Rubin's interest, and he initiated contact with the producer. However, Slayer's remaining members were apprehensive of leaving Metal Blade Records, with whom they were already under contract.

Lombardo contacted Columbia Records, which was Def Jam's distributor, and managed to get in touch with Rubin, who along with photographer Glen E. Friedman agreed to attend one of the band's concerts. Friedman had produced Suicidal Tendencies's self-titled debut album, in which Slayer vocalist Tom Araya made a guest appearance in the music video for the album's single "Institutionalized", pushing Suicidal Tendencies's vocalist Mike Muir. Around this time, Rubin asked Friedman if he knew Slayer.

Guitarist Jeff Hanneman was surprised by Rubin's interest in the band, and was impressed by his work with the hip hop acts Run DMC and LL Cool J. During a visit by Slagel to a European music convention, Rubin spoke with the band directly, and persuaded them to sign with Def Jam. Slagel paid a personal tribute to Rubin, and said that Rubin was the most passionate of all the label representatives the band were in negotiations with. Following the agreement, Friedman brought the band members to Seattle for two days of publicity shots, possible record shots, and photos for a tour book; Rubin felt no good photos of the band had been taken before that point. One of the photos was used on the back cover of the band's 1988 release South of Heaven.

Cover art
The cover artwork was designed by Larry Carroll, who at the time was creating political illustrations for The Progressive, Village Voice, and The New York Times. The cover art was featured in Blender Magazine's 2006 "top ten heavy metal album covers of all time." Despite its warm reception, the band members themselves originally did not like the image. King said, "nobody in the band wanted that cover. We were stuck with it." He even described the artist as a "warped demented freak," although Carroll went on to make cover arts for their next albums South of Heaven (1988), Seasons in the Abyss (1990) and Christ Illusion (2006).

It was believed that Columbia Records initially refused to release Reign in Blood because of the disturbing imagery. Araya refuted this claim in 2016 saying that it was because of the song "Angel of Death" and it had nothing to do with the cover art.

Recording
Reign in Blood was recorded and produced at Hit City West in Los Angeles with Rubin producing and Andy Wallace engineering. The album was the label boss' first professional experience with heavy metal, and his fresh perspective led to a drastic makeover of Slayer's sound. Steve Huey of AllMusic believed Rubin drew tighter and faster songs from the band, and delivered a cleanly produced sound that contrasted sharply with their previous recordings. This resulted in drastic changes to Slayer's sound, and changed audiences' perception of the band. Araya has since stated their two previous releases were not up to par production-wise.
Guitarist Kerry King later remarked that "[i]t was like, 'Wow—you can hear everything, and those guys aren't just playing fast; those notes are on time.'"

According to Araya, it was Hanneman's idea to add the scream for the introduction in "Angel of Death." Araya did several takes but ended up using the first one.

Hanneman later admitted that while the band was listening to Metallica and Megadeth at the time, they were finding the repetition of guitar riffs tiring. He said, "If we do a verse two or three times, we're already bored with it. So we weren't trying to make the songs shorter—that's just what we were into," which resulted in the album's short duration of 29 minutes. The band realized the album's runtime only when they were finishing up with its mixing with engineer Andy Wallace. The band weren't sure whether they would have to hit the studio to create more material or just leave it, so they turned to Rubin. “His only reply was that it had 10 songs, verses, choruses and leads and that’s what constituted an album. He didn’t have any issue with it," Araya told Metal Hammer. King had stated that while hour-long records seem to be the trend, "[y]ou could lose this part; you could cut this song completely, and make a much more intense record, which is what we're all about." When the record was completed, the band met with Rubin, who asked: "Do you realize how short this is?" Slayer members looked at each other, and replied: "So what?" The entire album was on one side of a cassette; King stated it was "neat," as "You could listen to it, flip it over, and play it again." The music is abrasive and faster than previous releases, helping to narrow the gap between thrash metal and its predecessor hardcore punk, and is played at an average of 220 beats per minute.

Lombardo's departure

Following the album's recording sessions, Slayer embarked on the Reign in Pain tour with the bands Overkill in the United States and Malice in Europe; they also served as the opening act for W.A.S.P.'s U.S. tour in 1987. In late 1986, drummer Lombardo quit the band. To continue the tour Slayer enlisted Whiplash drummer Tony Scaglione.

Rubin called Lombardo daily to insist he return, telling him: "Dude, you gotta come back in the band." Rubin offered Lombardo a salary, but he was still hesitant about returning; at this point Lombardo had been out of the band for several months. Lombardo returned in 1987; Rubin came to his house and picked him up in his Porsche, taking him to a Slayer rehearsal.

Critical reception

Although the album received no radio airplay, it was the band's first release to enter the Billboard 200, where it debuted at #127, and attained its peak position of 94 in its sixth week. The album also reached #47 on the UK Album Chart, and on November 20, 1992, it was certified gold in the US.

Reign in Blood was critically acclaimed by the underground and mainstream music press. Reviewing for AllMusic, Steve Huey awarded the album five out of five, describing it a "stone-cold classic." Stylus Magazine critic Clay Jarvis awarded the album an A+ grade, calling it a "genre-definer," as well as "the greatest metal album of all time." Jarvis further remarked the song "Angel of Death" "smokes the asses of any band playing fast and/or heavy today. Lyrically outlining the horrors to come, while musically laying the groundwork for the rest of the record: fast, lean and filthy." Kerrang! magazine described it as the "heaviest album of all time," and listed the album at #27 among the "100 Greatest Heavy Metal Albums of All Time". Metal Hammer magazine named it "the best metal album of the last 20 years" in 2006. Q Magazine ranked Reign in Blood among their list of the "50 Heaviest Albums of All Time", and Spin Magazine ranked the album #67 on their list of the "100 Greatest Albums, 1985–2005". Critic Chad Bowar stated: "1986's Reign in Blood is probably the best thrash album ever recorded." In August 2014, Revolver placed the album on its "14 Thrash Albums You Need to Own" list. In 2017, it was ranked 6th on Rolling Stone list of "100 Greatest Metal Albums of All Time".

Adrien Begrand of PopMatters observed that "[t]here's no better song to kick things off than the masterful 'Angel of Death', one of the most monumental songs in metal history, where guitarists Kerry King and Jeff Hanneman deliver their intricate riffs, drummer Dave Lombardo performs some of the most powerful drumming ever recorded, and bassist/vocalist Tom Araya screams and snarls his tale of Nazi war criminal Josef Mengele." When asked why Reign in Blood has retained its popularity, King replied: "If you released Reign in Blood today, no one would give a shit. It was timing; it was a change in sound. In thrash metal at that time, no one had ever heard good production on a record like that. It was just a bunch of things that came together at once." Decibel inducted Reign in Blood into the Decibel Magazine Hall of Fame in November 2004, being the first album to earn such award.

Legacy
Reign in Blood is regarded by critics as one of the most influential and extreme thrash metal albums. In its "Greatest Metal Bands Of All Time" poll, MTV praised Slayer's "downtuned rhythms, infectious guitar licks, graphically violent lyrics and grisly artwork," which they stated "set the standard for dozens of emerging thrash bands," while "Slayer's music was directly responsible for the rise of death metal." MTV described Reign in Blood as essential listening, and the album was ranked number 7 on IGN's "Top 25 Most Influential Metal Albums".

Asked during a press tour for 1994's Divine Intervention about the pressure of living up to Reign in Blood, King replied that the band did not try to better it, but just wanted to make music. In 2006, Blabbermouth'''s Don Kaye drew a comparison to the band's 2006 album Christ Illusion, and concluded, "Slayer may never make an album as incendiary as Reign in Blood again."

Rapper Necro was heavily influenced by the album, and has remarked that it takes him back to the 1980s, "when shit was pure". Ektomorf vocalist Zoltán Farkas describes the album as one of his primary influences. Paul Mazurkiewicz of Cannibal Corpse stated Lombardo's performance on the album helped him play faster throughout his career.
Kelly Shaefer of Atheist said: "When Reign in Blood came out it changed everything! That is easily the best extreme metal record ever!"

Hanneman said that the album was his personal favorite, reasoning it was "so short and quick and to the point".

Paul Bostaph – Slayer's drummer from 1992 to 2001, and from 2013 to 2019 – first heard the record while a member of Forbidden. At a party, he walked towards music he heard from another room, and approached Forbidden guitarist Craig Locicero. Asked what was playing, Locicero shouted, "The new Slayer record." After listening closely, Bostaph looked at Locicero, and concluded his band was "fucked".

Oderus Urungus of Gwar cited 'Altar of Sacrifice' as his favourite Slayer song: "It's the one I would always play for my friends when I was getting into Slayer. They would get this glazed look in their eyes and worship the speakers while doing the devil-horn thing."

In 2006, the album won a Metal Hammer award for Best Album of the Last 20 Years.

In 2016, Loudwire ranked Reign in Blood #1 among Slayer's eleven studio albums. In 2013, NME ranked it at number 287 in its list of the 500 Greatest Albums of All Time.

Live performances

The tracks "Raining Blood" and "Angel of Death" have become almost permanent additions to Slayer's live set, and were Hanneman's favorite tracks to play live. The band played Reign in Blood in its entirety throughout the fall of 2004, under the tour banner "Still Reigning". In 2004, a live DVD of the same name was released, which included a finale with the band covered in fake blood during the performance of "Raining Blood".

King later said that while the idea of playing Reign in Blood in its entirety was suggested before by their booking agency, it was met with little support. The band ultimately decided they needed to add more excitement to their live shows, and to avoid repetition incorporated the ideas of raining blood. When asked about using fake blood in future performances, King remarked: "It's time to move on, but never say never. I know Japan never saw it, South America and Australia never saw it. So you never know." In 2008 the band performed Reign in Blood in its entirety once again, this time in Paris, France, during the third European Unholy Alliance Tour.

Although it was omitted from a number of concerts because of short time allotments, Slayer have often said that they enjoy playing the album in its entirety. According to Hanneman: "We still enjoy playing these songs live. We play these songs over and over and over, but they're good songs, intense songs! If it were melodic songs or some kind of boring 'clap your hands' song, you'd be going crazy playing those every night. But our songs are just bam-bam-bam-bam, they're intense." The band was on stage for 70 minutes, which allowed only seven or eight additional songs to be played following the album's play. King stated this arrangement "alienates too many people". In the Unholy Alliance Tour of 2004, however, the album was played in its entirety during Slayer's set as the last ten songs to end the show. The album was performed live at the I'll Be Your Mirror London festival in May 2012. In May 2014, it was announced that Slayer would perform the album in its entirety at Riot Fest in Chicago and Denver.

Controversy
Lyrical themes

Def Jam's distributor, Columbia Records, refused to distribute the album due to the song "Angel of Death", because of its setting and description of the Holocaust. Reign in Blood was eventually distributed by Geffen Records; however, due to the controversy it did not appear on Geffen's release schedule and the Geffen logo was not put on the album.

For the album, Slayer decided to abandon much of the earlier Satanic themes explored on their previous album Hell Awaits, and write about issues that were more on a street level. Reign in Bloods lyrics include death, religion, insanity, and murder, while the lead track "Angel of Death" details human experiments conducted at the Auschwitz concentration camp by Josef Mengele, who was dubbed "the Angel of death" by inmates. The song led to accusations of Nazi sympathizing and racism, which have followed the band throughout their career.

Hanneman was inspired to write "Angel of Death" after he read a number of books on Mengele during a Slayer tour. Hanneman has complained people usually misinterpret the lyrics, and clarified: "Nothing I put in the lyrics that says necessarily he was a bad man, because to me — well, isn't that obvious? I shouldn't have to tell you that." The band utilized the controversy to attract publicity, incorporating the Reichsadler into their logo (also the S in the band's name resembles the Sig runes used by the SS), and writing a song in Divine Intervention titled "SS-3" --- which depicts Reinhard Heydrich, the second in command in the Schutzstaffel,  his assassination by the Czechoslovak Resistance, and the bloody reprisals for it.

Song covers
"Raining Blood" was covered by Tori Amos on her 2001 album Strange Little Girls. King has admitted that he thought the cover was odd: "It took me a minute and a half to find a spot in the song where I knew where she was. It's so weird. If she had never told us, we would have never known. You could have played it for us and we'd have been like, 'What's that?' Like a minute and a half through I heard a line and was like, 'I know where she's at!'". The band, however, liked the cover enough to send Slayer T-shirts to her. The song was also covered by Malevolent Creation, Chimaira, Vader, Dokaka, Reggie and the Full Effect and Killick Erik Hinds, who covered the entire album on a H'arpeggione. "Raining Blood" was also covered by the New Zealand drum and bass band Concord Dawn on their 2003 album Uprising, and by Nashville, Tennessee band Asschapel on their 7" "Satanation". A medley of "Raining Blood" and "Postmortem" appears on Body Count's 2016 album Bloodlust, preceded by a short monologue by lead singer Ice-T where he names Slayer as both a major influence on Body Count and as one of his favorite bands of all time "and always will be"; a video for Body Count's version was released in August 2017.

In 2005, the Slayer tribute band Dead Skin Mask released an album with eight Slayer tracks, including "Angel of Death". The death metal band Monstrosity covered the song in 1999, while the track was featured on the classical band Apocalyptica's 2006 album Amplified / A Decade of Reinventing the Cello. A Slayer tribute album titled Al Sur del Abismo (Tributo Argentino a Slayer), compiled by Hurling Metal Records, featured sixteen tracks covered by Argentina metal bands, including Asinesia's version of "Angel of Death".

Popular culture
"Raining Blood" was featured in the South Park episode, "Die Hippie, Die", which aired on March 16, 2005. The plot centers on the town of South Park, which has been overrun by hippies. Eric Cartman states "Hippies can't stand death metal" and proceeds to drill through a hippie concert onto the main stage to change the audio to "Raining Blood", making the hippies run away. King found the episode humorous and expressed his appreciation for the show, ending the interview with "It was good to see the song being put to good use, if we can horrify some hippies we've done our job." "Angel of Death" also appears in several movies, including Gremlins 2, at the point when the character Mohawk turns into a spider, Jackass: The Movie, where it is played during a car stunt scene, and in the 2005 Iraq War documentary Soundtrack to War.

"Angel of Death" was featured in the multi–platform video game Tony Hawk's Project 8. Nolan Nelson, who selected the soundtrack for the game, asserts: "one of the greatest heavy metal songs ever recorded. Don't know who Slayer is? I feel sorry for you." "Raining Blood" was included in the Grand Theft Auto: Vice City in–game radio station V-Rock.
"Raining Blood" is also one of the songs featured in Guitar Hero 3: Legends of Rock and later Guitar Hero Smash Hits, and is considered one of the most difficult songs in the game, if not the hardest of the career song list.
"Angel of Death" and "Raining Blood" are both available as DLC for Rocksmith 2014 and for the Rock Band series.

In season 1, episode 6 of The Leftovers, the character Nora Durst (played by Carrie Coon) pays a prostitute to shoot her in the chest while she wears a Kevlar vest, playing "Angel of Death" to mask the sound of gunfire.

Track listing

Personnel
 Tom Araya – bass, vocals
 Kerry King – guitars
 Jeff Hanneman – guitars
 Dave Lombardo – drumsProduction'''
 Larry Carroll – artwork
 Rick Rubin – production
 Andy Wallace – engineering
 Howie Weinberg – mastering

Charts and certifications

Charts

Certifications

References

Notes

External links

 Reign in Blood (Adobe Flash) at Radio3Net (streamed copy where licensed)

1986 albums
Albums produced by Rick Rubin
Def Jam Recordings albums
American Recordings (record label) albums
Slayer albums